Schönburg Castle (German: Burg Schönburg), is in the municipality of Schönburg, Saxony-Anhalt, Germany. It has been proposed by Germany as a World Heritage Site.

Location 
The Late Romanesque ruins of Schönburg Castle are on top of a mottled sandstone cliff by the Saale River, which is 40 metres high and declines sharply in the west. The castle was built with the local mottled sandstone.

History 
The castle on top of the southern slopes of the Saale was erected as the most important castle in the 12th century on commission by the bishops of Naumburg. The bishops owned several castles within their territory to secure their assets. From 1158 at the latest, a free noble family that owned property around Naumburg named itself after the castle. It was first documented in 1137. Schönburg has been preserved to this day and is an example from the time of classical castle construction.

Architecture 

All the walls, gates and parts of the Palas have retained their original substance from the High Middle Ages, as have parts of the interior like visible chimneys dated to 1220 and decorated windows. The architecture and decorations found here correspond to other monuments in the World Heritage nomination.

World Heritage Nomination 
Schönburg Castle is one of the eleven components of the cultural landscape “Naumburg Cathedral and the High Medieval Cultural Landscape of the Rivers Saale and Unstrut”. As a landmark the castle is an important part of the lines of sight connecting the cultural landscape as a whole. 
 
The World Heritage nomination is representative for the processes that shaped the continent during the High Middle Ages between 1000 and 1300: Christianization, the so-called “Landesausbau”  and the dynamics of cultural exchange and transfer characteristic for this very period.

See also
 World Heritage Site
 World Heritage Committee
 High Middle Ages
 Cultural Landscape

References

Notes

External links 
 Video of the cultural landscape of Naumburg

Cultural heritage
Cultural studies
12th-century establishments in the Holy Roman Empire
Landscape
Saxony-Anhalt